Edward Stanton may refer to:

Edward Stanton (sculptor) (1681–1734), English mason and sculptor
Edward Stanton (British Army officer) (1827–1907), British officer and diplomat
Edward L. Stanton III (born 1972–present), United States Attorney for the Western District of Tennessee and Judicial nominee for the same district